Onsen Musume (japanese: 温泉むすめ) is a Japanese multimedia project featuring anime characters within the theme of onsen (Japanese hot springs). The characters anthropomorphize onsen as entities in anime, manga, and video games about them. The project began in November 2016, with an accompanying music video by Doga Kobo in 2017. They also have live concerts and events with the characters' voice actresses.

Summary 

Onsen Musume are minor goddesses who live in every onsen. During the day Onsen Musume go to school in Odaiba, Tokyo to learn how to help more people learn about each Musume's respective onsen, and also to learn special arts that help guests relax and smile.

One day they receive a proclamation from Sunahiko, the god who rules over all of the onsen, commanding them to become idols. The Onsen Musume form idol groups in order to compete in the newly-created idol tournament.

The main character of the series is Yuina Kusatsu, the Onsen Musume for Kusatsu Onsen. With eight other Onsen Musume, she forms an idol group called "SPRiNGS". In school the nine members are known as the "weird ones", but as idols they aim to become the best Onsen Musume idol group in Japan.

Characters 

As of September 2018, there are 110 Onsen Musume representing onsen in Taiwan and all 47 prefectures of Japan.

 Urume Aria (潤目アリア)
 Voiced by Kikuko Inoue
 Sunahiko (スクナヒコ)
 Voiced by Nana Mizuki

SPRiNGS
A group made of 9 of the "weird students" at the Onsen Musume School.

 Yuina Kusatsu (草津結衣奈)
 Voiced by Yūki Takada
 Image color is yellow; represents Kusatsu Onsen. She is the center of SPRiNGS.
 Saya Hakone (箱根彩耶)
 Voiced by Rika Nagae
 Image color is purple;  represents Miyanoshita Onsen.
 Nanako Akiu (秋保那菜子)
 Voiced by Karin Takahashi
 Image color is green; represents Akiu Onsen.
 Rinka Arima (有馬輪花)
 Voiced by Kana Motomiya
 Image color is red; represents Arima Onsen with her sister Fuuka. 
 Izumi Dogo (道後泉海)
 Voiced by Minami Shinoda
 Image color is orange; represents Dogo Onsen. She is the leader of SPRiNGS.
 Ayase Noboribetsu (登別綾瀬）
 Voiced by Natsumi Hioka
 Image color is sky blue; represents Noboribetsu Onsen.
 Mitsuki Gero (下呂美月)
 Voiced by Yurika Endō (until 2018), Iori Saeki (2018–present)
 Image color is blue; represents Gerō Onsen.
 Fuuka Arima (有馬楓花)
 Voiced by Yūki Kuwahara
 Image color is plum; represents Arima Onsen with her sister Rinka.
 Kanade Baden Yufuin (奏・バーデン由布院)
 Voiced by Misaki Watada
 Image color is pink; represents Yufuin Onsen.

暁-AKATSUKI- 
SPRiNGS's strongest rival. Other groups simply can't compare to their performances. Each member performs so well that they could easily become the centers of other groups.

 Hinata Kinugawa (鬼怒川日向)
 Voiced by Miyu Tomita
 Image color is orange; represents Kinugawa Onsen. She is the center of AKATSUKI.
 Kei Tamatsukuri (玉造彗)
 Voiced by Masumi Tazawa
 Image color is crimson; represents Tamatsukuri Onsen.
 Tamaki Beppu (別府環綺)
 Voiced by Yuka Iwahashi
 Image color is indigo; represents Beppu Onsen.

LUSH STAR 
LUSH STAR is the rival group that SPRiNGS gets along best with. Members of both groups were friends long before Sunahiko's proclamation. Their specialty is making everyone watching their performance feel more energetic.

 Uika Atami (熱海初夏)
 Voiced by Kaede Hondo
 Image color is dark green; represents Atami Onsen. She is the Center of LUSH STAR.
 Erina Ibusuki (指宿絵璃菜)
 Voiced by Satsumi Matsuda
 Image color is hot pink; represents Ibusuki Onsen.
 Mana Wakura (和倉雅奈)
 Voiced by Megumi Toda
 Image color is violet; represents Wakura Onsen.
 Koyuki Ginzan (銀山小雪)
 Voiced by Maria Naganawa 
 Image color is light yellow; represents Ginzan Onsen.
 Honami Shirahama (白浜帆南美)
 Voiced by Yuna Taniguchi
 Image color is light blue; represents Nanki-Shirahama Onsen.

Adhara 
SPRiNGS's polar opposite, Adhara gives refined and exact performances. They charm audiences with their otherworldly aura.

 Kira Kurokawa (黒川姫楽)
 Voiced by Minami Tanaka
 Image color is dark violet; represents Kurokawa Onsen. She is Adhara's center.
 Suika Hanamaki (花巻吹歌)
 Voiced by Riho Iida
 Image color is pale green. Represents Hanamaki Onsen.
 Nodoka Nyuto (乳頭和)
 Voiced by Shiori Mikami
 Image color is light pink; represents Nyūtō Onsen.
 Tomoe Shirahone (白骨朋依)
 Voiced by Hiyori Nitta 
 Image color is lavender; represents Shirahone Onsen.
 Momo Konpira (こんぴら桃萌))
 Voiced by Yuri Yoshida
 Image color is deep pink; represents Konpira Onsen.
 Kurumi Tsukioka (月岡来瑠碧)
 Voiced by Nozomi Nishida
 Image color is emerald; represents Tsukioka Onsen.
 Seira Yunokawa (湯の川星羅) 
 Voiced by Ruriko Yamaguchi
 Image color is cyan; represents Yunokawa Onsen

petit corolla 
An idol group that studies SPRiNGS's performances.

 Hana Ikaho (伊香保葉凪)
 Voiced by Himika Akaneya
 Represents Ikaho Onsen.
 Rikka Ureshino (嬉野六香)
 Voiced by Ari Ozawa
 Represents Ureshino Onsen.
 Tsubaki Ito (伊東椿月)
 Voiced by Eri Suzuki
 Represents Ito Onsen.
 Arisa Kinosaki (城崎亜莉咲)
 Voiced by Nanami Yamashita
 Represents Kinosaki Onsen.

Web Radio 
Since April 24, 2017 Onsen Musume has been broadcasting a radio show every Monday titled "Onsen Musume: Present-ish web radio! Mimipoka!! YOU should come and play, yo!~". It is hosted by each of the characters. Once a month they broadcast the show live from Haneda Airport's International terminal's TIAT Sky Hall. On April 2, 2018 they began broadcasting a second Monday radio show, the "Onsen Musume Public Relations Department". Each episode is accompanied by a simple video. It is hosted by Seitaro Mukai, and Onsen Musume characters appear as regular guests.

Manga 

 Onsen Musume 1-panel manga theater
 Starting January 25, 2017, manga by Erika Ragunoha were published on the Onsen Musume Twitter feed.
 Onsen Musume 4-panel manga theater
 A 4-panel manga by Eku Kamikura was published on the Onsen Musume Twitter on November 30, 2017. After that, on March 29, 2018, they began publishing weekly 4-panel manga by Watanon.
 Web manga
 On April 24, 2017 a web manga by Mikura Chikage was announced. It was expected to start in May 2018,  but the first chapter was released in September instead.

Video game 
"Onsen Musume Yunohana Collection" was released on August 3, 2018 for Android and iOS. It uses the player's location data to find onsen near them, and also includes original stories and over 100 characters.

References

External links 

 

Mass media franchises
Hot springs of Japan
Animated musical groups
Japanese pop music groups
Japanese idol video games
Android (operating system) games
IOS games